The MCKK Premier 7s 2011 was the first tournament of Malay College Rugby Premier Sevens, which involved teams from Malaysia premier schools and international schools (Vajiravudh College of Thailand). It were held from 26th till 27 February 2011. It were sponsored by DiGi as title sponsor. The tournament were won by Sekolah Sukan Tengku Mahkota Ismail which beaten Sekolah Menengah Sultan Yahya Petra in Cup final with score 36-7 to claim the first title. Vajiravudh College send their under 16 team in this inaugural tournament.

Competition format

The schedule featured a total of 48 matches, divided into half for two days. The first day were filled with groups matches. The 24 teams were grouped into 8 groups consisting of 3 teams per group. The second day were filled with tournament knock-out stages. The third placing teams of each group will contest in quarter-finals Shield while the second-placing teams of each group contested in quarter-finals Bowl. Whereas the group champions will fight their places in Cup/Plate quarter-finals.

Group stage

Group A

Group B

Group C

Group D

Group E

Group F

Group G

Group H

Finals

Shield

Bowl

Cup/Plate Quarter Finals
The winner of the quarter finals gain entrance to Cup semi-finals. The defeated at this quarter final gain entrance to Plate semi-finals.

Plate

Cup

Sponsors
Title Sponsor - DiGi Telecommunications
Premier Sponsors - Telekom Malaysia and UEM Group
Corporate Sponsors - CIMB Foundation, MTU Services, Hopetech, Scomi, Puspakom, Proton, Permanis Sandilands and Carisbrook.

See also 

 Rugby League World Cup
 Women's Rugby World Cup
 Rugby World Cup Overall Record

References

2007
2011 rugby sevens competitions
2011 in Asian rugby union
rugby union